Orestimba Creek, originally Arroyo de Orestimba (Orestimba, a Yokutsan word for "meeting place") is a tributary of the San Joaquin River draining eastern slopes of part of the Diablo Range within the San Joaquin Valley of California.

The Creek has its source at the confluence of the north and south forks of Orestimba Creek and its mouth at the San Joaquin River, is about 7 1/2 miles north of Newman in Stanislaus County.

History
Arroyo Orestimba was a watering place on El Camino Viejo in the San Joaquin Valley and was the primary water source for Rancho Orestimba y Las Garzas near its northern boundary. The ranch house of Rancho Orestimba y las Garzas, was built above the sycamore grove on Arroyo de Orestimba.

References

External links
 Henry W. Coe State Park
 California Water Indicators Portal: Orestimba Creek watershed

Rivers of Stanislaus County, California
Tributaries of the San Joaquin River
Diablo Range
Geography of the San Joaquin Valley
El Camino Viejo
Rivers of Northern California